Donald Schaible (born 1957) is an American politician. He is a member of the North Dakota State Senate from the 31st District, serving since 2010. He is a member of the Republican party.

References

1957 births
21st-century American politicians
Living people
People from Grant County, North Dakota
Republican Party North Dakota state senators